Oras, officially the Municipality of Oras, is a 3rd class municipality in the province of Eastern Samar, Philippines. According to the 2020 census, it has a population of 37,451 people.

History
In 1948, San Policarpo was created from the barrios of San Policarpo, Bahay, Alugan, Pangpang, Japonan, Tabo, Binogawan and Cajag-wayan, which used to belong to Oras. The territory of Oras was further reduced two years later, when Arteche was created from the barrios of San Ramon, Carapdapan, Beri, Tangbo, Catumsan, Bego, Concepcion, Casidman, Tawagan, and Tibalawon.

In 1952, the sitios of Trinidad, Tula, Pota, Palao, Sinalo-an, Tamse-on, Cagmalobago, and Maycorot, in the barrio of Agsam, were separated from said barrio and created into the barrio of Trinidad. In the same year, Santa Monica was transferred to the town of San Policarpo.

Geography

Barangays
Oras is politically subdivided into 42 barangays.

Climate

Demographics

Economy

Education 
Oras has 39 public elementary schools, 5 public high schools, and 1 private high school.

Elementary 
 Agsam Elementary School
 Alang-alang Primary School
 Anacta Primary School
 Bagacay Elementary School
 Balingasag Elementary School
 Balocawe Elementary School
 Bantayan Elementary School
 Batang Elementary School
 Bato Primary School
 Binalayan Elementary School
 Buntay Elementary School
 Burak Elementary School
 Cadi-an Elementary School
 Cagdine Elementary School
 Cagpile Elementary School
 Cagtoog Elementary School
 Dalid Elementary School
 Dao Integrated School
 Factoria Elementary School
 Gamot Elementary School
 Iwayan Elementary School
 Japay Elementary School
 Kalaw Elementary School
 Mabuhay Elementary School
 Malingon Elementary School
 Minap-os Elementary School
 Nadacpan Elementary School
 Naga Elementary School
 Oras East Central Elementary School
 Oras West Central Elementary School
 Pangudtan Elementary School
 Rizal Elementary School
 Sabang Elementary School
 San Eduardo Elementary School
 Saugan Elementary School
 Saurong Elementary School
 Sta. Monica Integrated School
 Tawagan Elementary School
 Trinidad Elementary School

Secondary 

 Holy Cross Academy - Brgy. Butnga
 Nicasio M. Alvarez II Memorial National High School - Brgy. San Eduardo
 Nicasio M. Alvarez II Memorial National High School (Sta. Monica Annex) - Brgy. Sta. Monica
 Oras National Agro-Industrial School - Brgy. Cadi-an
 Oras National High School - Brgy. San Roque
 Oras National High School (Dao Annex) - Brgy. Dao

References

External links
 [ Philippine Standard Geographic Code]
 Philippine Census Information
 Local Governance Performance Management System

Municipalities of Eastern Samar